The women's bantamweight (48 kg/105.6 lbs) Full-Contact category at the W.A.K.O. European Championships 2004 in Budva was the lightest of the female Full-Contact tournaments and involved just five fighters.  Each of the matches was three rounds of two minutes each and were fought under Full-Contact kickboxing rules.

As there were too few women for a tournament designed for eight, three of the ladies received byes through to the semi finals.  The tournament winner was Olesya Gladkova from Russia who defeated Veronique Legras of France by unanimous decision to claim the gold medal, in what was a repeat of the 2003 world championships final.  Jenny Hardengz from Sweden and Annika Pitkänen from Finland won bronze.

Results

Key

See also
List of WAKO Amateur European Championships
List of WAKO Amateur World Championships
List of female kickboxers

References

External links
 WAKO World Association of Kickboxing Organizations Official Site

W.A.K.O. European Championships 2004 (Budva)